Me and Molly is a play by Gertrude Berg based on Berg's long-running radio drama The Goldbergs. It premiered on Broadway at the Belasco Theatre on February 26, 1948, running for 156 performances through July 10, 1948.

The show starred Berg in the role of Molly Goldberg with Philip Loeb as Jake Goldberg, Lester Carr as Sammy Goldberg, Joan Lazer as Rosie Goldberg, Eli Mintz as Uncle David, Louis Sorin as Cousin Simon, and Margaret Feury as Vera Wertheimer.

It was voted “one of the season’s ten best plays”, according to the obituary of show producer Herbert Kenwith.

External links

References 

1948 plays
Broadway plays